The Enduring Passion for Ink: Films on Contemporary Ink Painters is a 2013 documentary film independently produced by scholar-curator Britta Erickson. The film features 10 contemporary Chinese ink artists at the vanguard of the contemporary Chinese art world today.

The documentary opens the door to what contemporary Chinese ink painting is to a wider audience and addresses fundamental choices confronting these leading ink artists.

Artists featured  
The 10 artists featured span a wide range of ages, education backgrounds, artistic approaches, and philosophies. They are:
 Bingyi
 Chen Haiyan
 Cui Zhenkuan
 Li Huasheng
 Li Jin
 Liu Dan
 Wang Dongling
 Xu Bing
 Yang Jiechang
 Zheng Chong bin

The film follows the scholar/curator of this project into the studios of these artists where the viewer can watch as these artist's work unfold.

The artists share in the intimacy of their studio their experience and views on ink as a medium versus other art forms, their creative expression, and the boundaries and innovation of ink art in relation to the traditional with scholar-curator Britta Erickson.

Development 
The film is solely produced, directed, curated by scholar-curator Britta Erickson who wished to create a project of her own at the time when she turned 50.

US-born Richard Widmer shot and edited the documentary.

Screening  
The film has been presented at: 
 The Asia Society, Hong Kong (May 2013) 
 Medienraum im Museum für Asiatische Kunst, Berlin (April 2016) 
 by The Ink Society, Hong Kong in collaboration with Duddell's (May 2016) 
 MOVIE MOVIE Life is Art Festival 2016 (September 2016) 
 ikonoTV (April 2017)

References 

2013 films
2013 documentary films
American documentary films
Documentary films about China
Documentary films about painters
Chinese art
Documentary film series
2010s English-language films
2010s American films